Nugra Salman , also known as Nugrat al-Salman or Nigrat Salman is a former prison facility near the village Salman in the desert of the Muthanna Governorate in Iraq. It has been constructed in 1930 during the Hashemite Monarchy and later also by the Governments of Abd al-Karim Qasim and Saddam Hussein.

Description  
Constructed in 1930, it is located near the Iraqi Saudi Arabian border beside the village Salman in the Muthanna Governorate. About 1.5 kilometer beside the village is Nugra Salman, with a watchtower in each corner. It lies within a depression in the southern desert of Iraq. At times the prison was not in use and villagers have kept their cattle in the building.

History 
It was used for the imprisonment of political prisoners and in 1964, the people of Samawah gained popular fame for rescuing over 1,000 political prisoners of the Iraqi Communist Party who were sent in a "Train of Death" (qutar al maut) in metal cargo rolling stock from Baghdad to Samawah en route to the Nigret Al Salman prison in 50 °C (122 °F) heat. The train was attacked by the city's people at the railway station, and the dehydrated prisoners were watered and fed. Over 100 of the prisoners had already perished. 

During the persecution of the Feyli Kurds by the Government of Saddam Hussein, Kurdish men considered of being able to fight, were also secluded in the prison if they were not deported to Iran.   
In 1982, after a failed assassination attempt on Saddam Hussein in Dujail, dozens of its inhabitants were imprisoned in the prison facility.. In the early eighties it was abandoned for some years before a new prison was built in the late 1980s.   

During the Anfal campaign directed at Kurds, thousands of prisoners were sent to Nugra Salman, and Human Rights Watch (HRW) estimates that the prison population was between 6'000 and 8'000.    

The first group consisted of elderly between 50 and 90 years of age and arrived in early April transported in a caravan of sealed buses coming from detention camps the north of Iraq. In May, another group of elderly from the region around the Lesser Zab arrived. In the summer months, groups of women arrived together with their children coming from Dibs, the women detention camp. In August 1988, a hundreds of prisoners arrived from Halabja, who having returned from Iran, were sent to Nugra Salman. The group of Halabja included, people of all ages, men, women and children.    

In September the Government of Iraq announced an Amnesty after which Nugra Salmans inmates were released, but in most cases not allowed to return to their villages and interned in camps under military rule until 1991, when the Kurdistan region achieved autonomy. The prison was in use until 2003, when it was abandoned.

References 

Prisons in Iraq
1930s establishments in Iraq
2003 disestablishments in Iraq